Baby Faced Beauty is a 2011 South Korean television series starring Jang Na-ra, Choi Daniel, Ryu Jin, and Kim Min-seo. It aired on KBS2 from May 2 to July 5, 2011 on Mondays and Tuesdays at 21:55 for 20 episodes. The drama is about an aspiring 34-year-old fashion designer who fakes her age to get a job in a fashion company.

The romantic comedy had kicked off with a viewership rating of around 6 percent, but gradually rose and surpassed the 15 percent mark. Originally slated for 18 episodes, it was extended by 2 more episodes due to its popularity. It ranked number one in its primetime timeslot for five consecutive weeks.

Synopsis
34-year-old So-young (Jang Na-ra), has lackluster education background (a mere high school degree) and bad credit history (due to her younger, spendthrift sister). After getting fired from a fabric factory she worked at for 14 years, she has trouble finding a new job. When her younger sister, So-jin (Oh Yeon-seo), rejects the offer of working at a fashion design company called "The Style", So-young decides to take her sister's place by pretending to be 10 years younger. Other than the specialty of turning ordinary materials into something special, her advantage is her babyface. In the workplace, she encounters Seung-il (Ryu Jin), the company president who eyes her with interest, and Jin-wook (Choi Daniel), a marketing director who falls in love with her without knowing that she is seven years older than him.

Cast

Main
Jang Na-ra as Lee So-young
Choi Daniel as Choi Jin-wook
Ryu Jin as Ji Seung-il
Kim Min-seo as Kang Yoon-seo

Supporting
The Style Design Company
Hong Rok-gi as Manager Jang Ki-hong
Son Hwa-ryung as Assistant Manager Jang Mi-soon
Yoo Yun-ji as Park Na-ra
Kim Mi-kyung as Director Baek
Na Young-hee as Managing Director Hyun Ji-sook
Yoo Tae-woong as Team Leader Kim Joon-soo

Extended

Oh Yeon-seo as Lee So-jin
Hyun Young as Ji Joo-hee
Yoon Hee-seok as Noh Yong-joon, So-young's uncle
Ahn Seo-hyun as Ji Hyun-yi
Kim Hye-ok as Jung-ok, So-young's mother
Kim Kyu-chul as So-young's father
Kim Bo-yoon as Kwon Hye-jung
Park Chul-min as Sun-nam
Lee Seung-hyung as Director Ahn Jung-nam
Yoon Joo-sang as Jin-wook's father
Geum Ho-suk as Min-ki
Clara Lee as Chae Seul-ah
Bang Min-ah as Hye-mi (cameo, ep 1 & 6)
Jeon So-min as Lee Jin-hee (cameo)
Park Sung-kwang (cameo)
Jung Joo-eun

Ratings

Awards

2011 KBS Drama Awards
Excellence Award, Actress in a Miniseries – Jang Na-ra 
Excellence Award, Actor in a Miniseries – Choi Daniel

International broadcast
It aired on Japanese cable channel KNTV from November 18, 2011 to January 27, 2012, with reruns on cable channel LaLaTV beginning June 25, 2014.
It aired on Thailand on Workpoint TV beginning September 24, 2013.

Notes

References

External links 
  
 
 
 

2011 South Korean television series debuts
2011 South Korean television series endings
Korean Broadcasting System television dramas
Korean-language television shows
South Korean romantic comedy television series
Television series by AStory